The 33rd Golden Globe Awards, honoring the best in film and television for 1975, were held on January 24, 1976. Nashville received 11 nominations; the most for a single film. As of 2022, the film still holds that record.

Winners and nominees

Film

Television

Best Series - Drama
 Kojak
Baretta
Columbo
Petrocelli
Police Story

Best Series - Comedy or Musical
 Barney Miller
 All in the Family
 The Carol Burnett Show
 Chico and the Man
 The Mary Tyler Moore Show

Best Actor - Drama Series
 Robert Blake - Baretta 
 Telly Savalas - Kojak
Peter Falk - Columbo
Karl Malden - The Streets of San Francisco
Barry Newman - Petrocelli

Best Actress - Drama Series
 Lee Remick - Jennie: Lady Randolph Churchill
Angie Dickinson - Police Woman
Rosemary Harris - Notorious Woman
Michael Learned - The Waltons
Lee Meriwether - Barnaby Jones

Best Actor - Comedy or Musical Series
 Alan Alda - M*A*S*H
Johnny Carson - The Tonight Show Starring Johnny Carson
Redd Foxx - Sanford and Son
Hal Linden - Barney Miller
Bob Newhart - The Bob Newhart Show
Carroll O'Connor - All in the Family

Best Actress - Comedy or Musical Series
 Cloris Leachman - Phyllis
Beatrice Arthur - Maude
Carol Burnett - The Carol Burnett Show
Valerie Harper - Rhoda
Mary Tyler Moore - Mary Tyler Moore

Best Supporting Actor
 Edward Asner - Mary Tyler Moore 
 Tim Conway - The Carol Burnett Show
Ted Knight - Mary Tyler Moore
Rob Reiner - All in the Family
Jimmie Walker - Good Times

Best Supporting Actress
 Hermione Baddeley - Maude
Susan Howard - Petrocelli
Julie Kavner - Rhoda
Nancy Walker - McMillan & Wife
Nancy Walker - Rhoda

See also
48th Academy Awards
27th Primetime Emmy Awards
28th Primetime Emmy Awards
 29th British Academy Film Awards
 30th Tony Awards
 1975 in film
 1975 in television

References
IMdb 1976 Golden Globe Awards

033
1975 film awards
1975 television awards
January 1976 events in the United States
Golden Globe